Eversand is a support vessel in service with Van Laar Maritime in the North Sea.  It served most of its career for the Waterways and Shipping Authority of Bremerhaven, Germany.

History
Eversand was laid down on 12 December 1972 at Schichau Unterweser AG in Bremerhaven, from where it was launched in 1973.  It served laying and tending buoys about the mouth of the Weser.  The ship also served to spray mudflats to assist in navigation.

The ship was decommissioned by the Waterways and Shipping Authority on 1 September 2012 and sold.  It was replaced in service by the Nordergründe.

The ship was acquired and serves as a support vessel for off-shore development with the Dutch company Van Laar Maritime.

References

Ships of Germany